Victor Auguste Godinet (30 January 1853 – 1 March 1936) was a French sailor who competed in the 1900 Summer Olympics. He was the crew member of the French boat Favorite 1, which won two silver medals in the races of the 2 to 3 ton class. He also participated in the Open class, but did not finish the race.

Further reading

References

External links
 

French male sailors (sport)
Sailors at the 1900 Summer Olympics – 2 to 3 ton
Sailors at the 1900 Summer Olympics – Open class
Olympic sailors of France
1853 births
1936 deaths
Olympic silver medalists for France
Olympic medalists in sailing
Medalists at the 1900 Summer Olympics
French people of Swiss descent
20th-century French people